Daniel Kaluuya is a British actor and writer who has received various accolades throughout his career including one Academy Award, two British Academy Film Awards, two Screen Actors Guild Awards, and one Golden Globe Award.

He played Michael "Tealeaf" Fry in the BBC dark comedy series Psychoville and Michael "Mac" Armstrong in the BBC Three horror drama series The Fades. He gained further acclaim for his performance as Bingham "Bing" Madsen in the Black Mirror episode "Fifteen Million Merits". Kaluuya appeared as Agent Colin Tucker in the 2011 film Johnny English Reborn and portrayed Black Death in the 2013 film Kick-Ass 2. In 2015, he had a supporting role in Denis Villeneuve's film Sicario. His breakthrough came for the critically acclaimed horror film Get Out (2017), for which he earned numerous accolades, including nominations for the Academy Award, BAFTA Award, SAG Award, and Golden Globe Award for Best Actor. That same year, he also received the BAFTA Rising Star Award.

In 2018, he starred in the Marvel Cinematic Universe film, Black Panther for which he, along with the rest of the cast, received a Screen Actors Guild Award for Outstanding Performance by a Cast in a Motion Picture. In 2018 he also starred crime thriller film Widows. In 2019, he starred in the romantic crime film, Queen & Slim for which he received a nomination for a NAACP Image Awards. In 2020, he starred as revolutionary socialist Fred Hampton in the biographical drama, Judas and the Black Messiah. His performance in the film was lauded by critics, and he received an Academy Award, a BAFTA Award, a  Golden Globe Award and a Screen Actors Guild Award, all for Best Actor in a Supporting Role. At 32, he is the seventh-youngest Best Supporting Actor winner of the former.

Major associations

Academy Awards

British Academy Film Awards

Golden Globe Awards

Primetime Emmy Awards

Screen Actors Guild Awards

Laurence Olivier Award

Industry awards

Evening Standard Theatre Awards

Gotham Awards

Independent Spirit Awards

National Board of Review

Critics awards

African American Film Critics Association

Austin Film Critics Association

Boston Society of Film Critics

Critics' Choice Movie Awards

Houston Film Critics Society

San Diego Film Critics Society

San Francisco Film Critics Circle

Seattle Film Critics Society

Washington D.C. Area Film Critics Association

Women Film Critics Circle

Miscellaneous awards

Black Reel Awards

IGN Awards

MTV Movie & TV Awards

NAACP Image Awards

Saturn Awards

Notes

References

External links
 

Kaluuya, Daniel